The Ballad Artistry of Milt Jackson is an album by vibraphonist Milt Jackson featuring performances recorded in 1959 and released on the Atlantic label.

Reception
The AllMusic review awarded the album 3 stars.

Track listing
All compositions are by Milt Jackson except as indicated:
 "The Cylinder" - 2:45  
 "Makin' Whoopee" (Walter Donaldson, Gus Kahn) - 3:02  
 "Alone Together" (Howard Dietz, Arthur Schwartz) - 4:50  
 "Tenderly" (Walter Gross, Jack Lawrence) - 4:29  
 "Don't Worry 'Bout Me" (Rube Bloom, Ted Koehler) - 4:02  
 "Nuages" (Django Reinhardt) - 3:38  
 "Deep in a Dream" (Eddie DeLange, Jimmy van Heusen) - 3:39  
 "I'm a Fool to Want You" (Joel Herron, Frank Sinatra, Jack Wolf) - 4:39  
 "The Midnight Sun Will Never Set" (Dorcas Cochran, Quincy Jones, Henri Salvador) - 3:48  
 "Tomorrow" - 3:22
Recorded in New York City on May 1, 1959 (tracks 6, 7, 9 & 10), September 9, 1959 (tracks 4, 5 & 8) and September 10, 1959 (tracks 1-3)

Personnel
Milt Jackson – vibes
Don Hammond - alto flute
Romeo Penque - reeds
Max Cahn, Alexander Cores, Paul Gershman, Julius Held, Leo Kahn, Harry Katzman, Harry Lookofsky, David Nadien, George Ockner, Gene Orloff, Leonard Posner, Sol Shapiro - violin
Al Brown, Harold Coletta, Burt Fisch, David Mankowitz - viola
Maurice Brown, Charles McCracken, Harvey Shapiro, George Ricci - cello
Gloria Agostini - harp
Jimmy Jones - piano, arranger
Barry Galbraith, Chuck Wayne - guitar
Bill Crow, Milt Hinton - bass
Connie Kay - drums
Quincy Jones - arranger, conductor

References 

Atlantic Records albums
Milt Jackson albums
1959 albums
Albums produced by Nesuhi Ertegun
Albums arranged by Quincy Jones